Thomas Cowan Anderson (born 24 September 1934) is a Scottish former professional footballer. He played as a forward, and was noted for his extremely fast pace.

Anderson was capped by Scotland schools, and had an amateur contract with Hearts. He began his professional career with Dumfries club, Queen of the South, in September 1955, leaving in November 1956.

Anderson joined Watford in January 1957. In his first spell with the club he made 52 league appearances, scoring 12 goals. Anderson moved to Bournemouth & Boscombe Athletic in June 1958 for a fee of £1,000, but in November the same year he moved to Queen's Park Rangers. He had only played five league games for Bournemouth, scoring once. He went on to score 3 times in 10 league games for Rangers in the 1958–59 season.

He moved again in July 1959, signing for Torquay United. He made his debut on 22 August 1959, the first day of the 1959–60 season, in a 2–1 home win against Doncaster Rovers. In his season with Torquay he played in nine league games, scoring four times. In June 1960 he moved to Stockport County, where he was to play more regularly, playing 60 league games and scoring 17 goals in his time with the club.

In November 1961 he moved to Doncaster Rovers, where he was to score 3 times in 16 league games. He made another swift move, this time to Wrexham in March 1962, going on to play twelve league games and score three goals for the club.

He subsequently moved to Australia, playing for Hellas before returning to England to join Barrow in December 1963. After only 11 league games he returned to Australia in February 1964 and rejoined Hellas. He rejoined Watford in December 1964, playing 21 league games and scoring twice for the Hornets in his second spell with the club. He joined St Mirren on a free transfer in October 1965, before leaving in December. He returned to Australia, playing for George Cross in Melbourne, before returning to England in July 1967 to join Leyton Orient for what was to be his final spell in English professional football. In December 1967 he became player-manager of Limerick. His contract was terminated in March 1968

He eventually settled in Australia, working in Sydney as a football journalist and radio presenter.

References

External links

1934 births
Living people
Footballers from East Lothian
People from Haddington, East Lothian
Scottish footballers
Association football inside forwards
Falkirk F.C. players
Queen of the South F.C. players
Watford F.C. players
AFC Bournemouth players
Queens Park Rangers F.C. players
Torquay United F.C. players
Stockport County F.C. players
Doncaster Rovers F.C. players
Wrexham A.F.C. players
South Melbourne FC players
Barrow A.F.C. players
St Mirren F.C. players
Caroline Springs George Cross FC players
Leyton Orient F.C. players
Limerick F.C. players
Scottish Football League players
English Football League players
League of Ireland players
Scottish football managers
Limerick F.C. managers
League of Ireland managers
Scottish expatriate footballers
Expatriate soccer players in Australia
Scottish expatriate sportspeople in Australia